The Cleft Palate-Craniofacial Journal is a monthly peer-reviewed medical journal. It was established in 1964 as the Cleft Palate Journal, obtaining its current title in 1991. The journal is published by SAGE Publishing on behalf of the American Cleft Palate-Craniofacial Association. It covers research on the etiology, prevention, diagnosis, and treatment of cleft palate and other craniofacial anomalies. The editor-in-chief is Jamie Perry.

Abstracting and indexing
The journal is abstracted and indexed in:
Current Contents/Clinical Medicine
Embase
Index Medicus/MEDLINE/PubMed
Science Citation Index Expanded
Scopus
According to the Journal Citation Reports, the journal has a 2019 impact factor of 1.347.

See also
List of medical journals

References

External links

Publications established in 1964
SAGE Publishing academic journals
Monthly journals
English-language journals
Orthopedics journals
Academic journals associated with learned and professional societies